Terence Martin Griffiths  (born 16 October 1947) is a Welsh retired professional snooker player and current snooker coach and pundit. In his second professional tournament, he became world champion when he won the 1979 World Snooker Championship. He was the second qualifier to win the title after Alex Higgins achieved the feat in 1972; only Shaun Murphy has done it since, winning the title in 2005. Griffiths defeated Dennis Taylor by 24  to 16 in the final. Nine years later, in 1988, Griffiths reached the final of the competition again. He was tied with Steve Davis at 8–8, but lost the match 11–18.

Griffiths reached at least the quarter-finals of the World Championship for nine consecutive years from 1984 to 1992. He also won the Masters in 1980 and the UK Championship in 1982, making him one of the players to have completed snooker's Triple Crown.

Although he also won several other tournaments, Griffiths' determination to match his rival Davis led to him making changes in his playing technique that commentators have claimed meant that he lost his natural flair for playing. He announced his retirement from professional snooker in 1996 to become the World Professional Billiards and Snooker Association's director of coaching, and developed a coaching career that has included working with leading players including Stephen Hendry, Mark Williams and Ding Junhui.

Early years
Terence Martin Griffiths was born in Llanelli on 16 October 1947. He gained a place at a grammar school but was expelled for truancy and then became a student at a secondary modern, where he played rugby union with future Welsh national team members Phil Bennett and Derek Quinnell. Griffiths started playing snooker when he was 14. After leaving school, he worked in a coal mine, and he became the youngest winner of the Llanelli and District snooker championship when he was 16. Griffiths won the West Wales snooker championship, and having changed his employment to become a bus conductor, had more time available to practise snooker. He later worked as a postman, and as an insurance salesman.

At the age of 17, he won the West Wales snooker championship. He compiled his first century break when he was 24, the same year that he first entered the Welsh Amateur Championship, finishing as runner up. He played in the amateur home internationals fourteen times, winning twelve of his matches, and after winning the Welsh Amateur Championship in 1975, gained a place at the 1976 World Amateur Snooker Championship where he reached the quarter-finals. Griffiths won the English Amateur Championship in 1977 and 1978 before turning professional on 1 June 1978, having been accepted as a member by the World Professional Billiards and Snooker Association at its meeting during the 1978 World Snooker Championship. Anticipating his acceptance as a professional, Snooker Scene wrote in May 1978 that "his power screws and long potting are second to no one's ... it will not be in the least surprising, if very soon he becomes a serious challenger for Snooker's top professional titles."

Early professional career 1978–1982
In his first professional match, in the qualifying competition for the 1978 UK Championship, Griffiths lost 8–9 to Rex Williams after leading 8–2. Williams took a 2–1 lead, before Griffiths won the next seven frames, and Williams took the following seven. Williams later potted the pink to secure victory. After qualifying for the 1979 World Championship, by eliminating Bernard Bennett 9–2 (from 0–2 behind) and Jim Meadowcroft 9–6 (from 6–6), Griffiths defeated the previous year's runner-up Perrie Mans 13–8 in the first round and Alex Higgins 13–12 in the quarter-finals. After beating Eddie Charlton 19–17 in a long semi-final that finished at 1:40 am, Griffiths told interviewer David Vine "I'm in the final now, you know." In the final, he faced Dennis Taylor, who, having been a professional since 1973, was also playing in his first world championship final. The match was close for the first four of the six , and the match was level at 15–15 before Griffiths took a 17–16 lead and went on to win 24–16, becoming world champion at the first attempt, in only his second tournament as a professional. He was only the second player to win the championship after playing in qualifying, after Higgins in 1972, and the first to win it at the Crucible as a qualifier. The only other player to achieve this, as at 2021, was Shaun Murphy in 2005.

In the following season, Griffiths reached the final of the 1979 Canadian Open, losing 16–17 to Cliff Thorburn, and was part of the Welsh team that won the inaugural World Cup of snooker: Ray Reardon, Doug Mountjoy and Griffiths defeated England 14–3 in the final. At the end of 1979, Griffiths faced John Virgo in the 1979 UK Championship final. Virgo had been penalised two frames for arriving late to a session, not having realised that the start time had been brought forward as requested by the television broadcasters, reducing his lead to 9–11. When the scores were 11–11, Griffiths offered to split the prize money. Virgo declined, and later won the match 14–13.

Griffiths was the subject of This Is Your Life in 1980. He won the 1980 Masters, defeating Alex Higgins 9–5 in front of a 2,323 spectators, a record crowd for a UK snooker event, at the Wembley Conference Centre after compiling a break of 131 to win the decisive frame. It was his first appearance at the Masters, and turned out to be his only win there. He also won the 1980 Irish Masters,  defeating Mountjoy 10–9 in the final.

Defending champion at the World Championship, Griffiths lost the first seven frames against Davis in his first match, and ended the first session trailing 1–7. Davis won the opening frame of the second session to extend his lead to 8–1, and had a seven frame lead again at 10–3, before Griffiths won three frames to end the session 6–10 behind. In the third session, Griffiths won the first four frames to level at 10–10, with Davis then winning the next three to secure a 13–10 victory, which included a 116 break in the 22nd frame. The failure of first-time world snooker champions to defend their title has become known as the "Crucible curse."

Griffiths and his Wales team-mates retained the 1980 World Challenge Cup for Wales, and he again won the Irish Masters in 1981 before losing to eventual winner Davis in the quarter-finals of the 1981 World Snooker Championship. Griffiths lost 3–16 to Davis in the 1981 UK Championship final, the first of five finals in consecutive events contested by the pair. Griffiths triumphed in two of the five, winning on the final black, 9–8 in the deciding frame of the 1982 Classic after Davis had recovered from 3–8 to 8–8. He also won the Irish Masters, defeating Davis 9–5. After Davis was unexpectedly defeated by Tony Knowles in the first round of the World Championship that year, Griffiths became the bookmakers' favourite for the title. However, he also lost in the first round, to Willie Thorne. At the end of 1982, he won the UK Championship, defeating Alex Higgins 16–15 in the final.

Professional career 1983 to 1989
He never again won a ranking event, although he won several invitational events, including the 1984 Malaysian Masters, where he topped a round robin group (Tony Meo was the runner-up); the 1984 Singapore Masters, where he also topped a round robin group (Davis was the runner-up); and the 1985 Hong Kong Masters, where he defeated Davis 4–2.

The 1985–86 snooker season saw Griffiths claim the Welsh Professional Championship for the first time. He also won the 1986 Belgian Classic, where he beat Kirk Stevens 9–7 in the final. At the 1986 World Snooker Championship, he led Joe Johnson 12–9 in their quarter-final, but Johnson claimed the next four frames, making two century breaks on the way to a 13–12 victory, and went on to win the title. Two months before the championship, Griffiths had started working with coach Frank Callan, and, after eliminating Higgins in the last 16, praised Callan for helping his game, saying that "I tried to do the right things myself for three years ... Frank has knitted it all together for me. I didn't think anyone knew that much about snooker." He ended the season by winning the 1986 Pontins Professional, defeating Willie Thorne in the final.

He was the only player to reach the televised stages of each ranking tournament in the 1986–87 season, but did not reach the semi-finals in any of them. At the end of the season, he moved up four place in the rankings to 10th. In 1987, he opened his own billiard hall, The Terry Griffiths Matchroom, in Llanelli.

Griffiths took the Pot Black title in 1984 and won the Welsh Professional Championship again in 1986 and 1988. He again reached the final of the World Snooker Championship in 1988, defeating Steve Longworth, Willie Thorne, Neal Foulds and Jimmy White, to reach the final, which he lost to Davis, 11–18. The players had been level at 8–8 after the first of two-day's play in the final, and Terry Smith of the Daily Telegraph commented after the match that "Griffiths knows he produced his best snooker since he became world champion in 1979, and still lost."

The 1989 European Open was his only final of the following season. Having built a 4–1 lead against John Parrott, Griffiths saw his opponent level the match at 4–4 by the end of the first session. Griffiths later led 8–7, but Parrott won the match, and his first major title, 9–8.

Professional career 1989 to 1997
In the 1989–90 snooker season, Griffiths reached the semi-finals of both the 1989 Asian Open and the 1989 UK Championship, and the quarter-finals of the 1990 World Snooker Championship. His only final was at the 1989 Scottish Masters, where he lost 1–10 to Stephen Hendry. At the end of the season, he dropped one place in the world rankings, to sixth. In the following season, he was again runner-up to Hendry at the Scottish Masters, but did not achieve much success in ranking events, and fell from 6th to 11th place at the season's end.

He moved back to the 6th ranking after the 1991–92 snooker season, during which he reached two ranking tournament semi-finals and the semi-final of the 1992 World Championship, with victories over Bob Chaperon, Neal Foulds and Peter Ebdon before losing to Stephen Hendry. In the following season his best performance at a ranking tournament was reaching the semi-final of the 1992 Grand Prix, which he lost 6–9 to Ken Doherty, and his best showings at ranking tournaments over the next three seasons were a single quarter-final appearance in each.

At the 1996 World Snooker Championship, Griffiths eliminated Jamie Burnett in a final frame decider, 10–9, in the first round, having trailed 0–6 and 5–9. In the second round, he lost to his old rival Steve Davis (whom he never defeated at the Crucible in six attempts), and then announced his retirement from the game to become the World Professional Billiards and Snooker Association's Director of Coaching. Griffiths retired whilst 23rd in the rankings, the first year since his debut season that he had not been in the elite top 16. despite only entering the 1997 World Championship qualifiers in his final season as a professional. Clive Everton wrote that at the time Griffiths was "the only player to retire when his standard was still in touch with the circuit's top players." Griffiths won his qualifying match to play in the main tournament at the Crucible one last time, where he lost in the first round to fellow countryman and debutant Mark Williams, in another final-frame decider, 9–10. During his professional snooker career, Griffiths played a total of 999 frames at the Crucible.

In their book Masters of the Baize, Luke Williams and Paul Gadsby speculated that Griffiths may have won more tournaments if he had not adjusted his playing technique to try and challenge Davis. Gordon Burn reported in his 1986 book Pocket Money that Reardon felt that Griffiths had started to decline as a player from the point that he signed a management contract with Barry Hearn, Davis's manager, at the end of the 1981–82 snooker season, and that changes that Griffiths had made to his stance and cueing, losing his "natural flair." Burn also noted that after Hearn took over as Griffiths's manager, "In the first year, Hearn tripled Griffiths' income and halved his work."  He quotes Griffiths saying "I just found it difficult to accept that there was a better player than me in the world" but that is efforts to change his way of playing, rather than meaning he was approaching Davis's standard, meant "I wasn't even getting at Steve Davis, because other players were beating me first." Everton wrote about Griffiths's change of technique that "While he acquired an encyclopaedic technical knowledge in the process and maintained an admirable consistency, he could never quite recapture the flair and inspiration that had brought him the world title." As a winner of the world championship, UK championship and Masters during his career, Griffiths is one of the players to have achieved the Triple Crown.

Later career
Griffiths resigned as the WPBSA director of coaching in 1998, describing the Association as "a hopeless set-up with no one giving the staff any direction at all." He has coached many top players, including Mark Williams, Marco Fu, Mark Allen, Ali Carter, Joe Perry, Barry Hawkins, Ding Junhui, Stephen Hendry and Stephen Maguire. He has said of his coaching that "it used to be a lot of technical stuff years ago – probably 90% on the technical side. Now it's the other way about, perhaps 80–20% on the mental side." He was the Director of Coaching at the South West Snooker Academy. He also commentates on snooker for the BBC. In 2007, Griffiths was awarded an OBE for "services to snooker". In 2021, he launched "SQ", a handicapping system for snooker. His son Wayne Griffiths is the head snooker coach at the Hong Kong Sports Institute and has coached three-time women's world champion Ng On-yee. During his career he won over a million pounds in prize money.

Performance and rankings timeline

Career finals
Sources for the ranking and ron-ranking final results can be found in the Performance timeline section above.

Ranking finals: 3 (1 title)

Non-ranking finals: 40 (17 titles)

Team finals: 5 (2 titles)

Pro-am finals: 2 (1 title)

Amateur finals: 4 (3 titles)

Publications

Notes

References

External links
World Snooker Tour Profile
Terry Griffiths' Official Site

1947 births
British sports broadcasters
Living people
British postmen
Masters (snooker) champions
Officers of the Order of the British Empire
Snooker players from Llanelli
Trick shot artists
Welsh snooker players
BBC sports presenters and reporters
UK champions (snooker)
Winners of the professional snooker world championship